Sam Brown may refer to:

Historical figures
 Sam Brown (frontiersman) (1845–1925), American frontiersman, educator, civic leader, advocate for Native Americans, and historian
 Sam Brown (outlaw) (1831–1861), American gunfighter in the Wild West
 Sam H. Brown, American farmer and politician from Oregon in the early 20th century
 Sam Brown (activist) (born 1943), organized the Moratorium to End the War in Vietnam

Arts and entertainment
 Sam Brown (Rastafari) (1925–1998), Jamaican Rastafarian elder and roots reggae singer and poet
 Sam Brown (guitarist) (1939–1977), American jazz guitarist with Thad Jones/Mel Lewis Big Band
 Sam Brown (singer) (born 1964), English singer/songwriter, daughter of singer Joe Brown
 Sam Brown III (born 1947), AKA Samm Brown, American songwriter, record producer, arranger and composer worked a lot with African American artists
 Sam Brown (comedian) (born 1981), American comedian, founding member of sketch troupe Whitest Kids U Know
 Sam Brown (artist), American artist and author, noted for his exploding dog web site

Sports
 Sam Brown (baseball) (1878–1931), Major League Baseball player
 Sam Brown (soccer) (born 1996), American soccer player

See also 
 Sam Browne (disambiguation)
 Samuel Brown (disambiguation)
 Sam Brown House, an 1857 historic house built by the above-named senator
 Samantha Brown (born 1970), Travel Channel personality